Fanfan la Tulipe is a 1925 French swashbuckler film directed by René Leprince based on a screenplay by Pierre-Gilles Veber and starring Aimé Simon-Girard, Simone Vaudry, and Jacques Guilhène.

Cast 
Aimé Simon-Girard as Fanfan la Tulipe
Simone Vaudry as Perrette
Jacques Guilhène as Louis XV
Claude France as Mme de Pompadour
Pierre de Guingand as Marquis d'Aurilly
Renée Héribel as Mme Favart
Paul Guidé as Chevalier de Lurbeck
Alexandre Colas as Le maréchal de Saxe
Jean Peyrière as M. Favart
Paul Cervières as Fier-à-Bras
Jean Demerçay as  Duc de Cumberland
Mario Nasthasio as  Marquis d'Argenson

References

Bibliography 
 Dayna Oscherwitz & MaryEllen Higgins. The A to Z of French Cinema. Scarecrow Press, 2009.

External links
 

1925 films
1920s French-language films
French swashbuckler films
1920s historical adventure films
French historical adventure films
Films set in the 18th century
French silent feature films
Pathé films
French black-and-white films
Silent historical adventure films
1920s French films